Anolis chrysops is a species of lizard in the family Dactyloidae. The species is found on the Petite Terre Islands in Guadeloupe.

References

Anoles
Endemic fauna of Guadeloupe
Reptiles of Guadeloupe
Reptiles described in 1964